Puthrakameshti is a 1972 Indian Malayalam film, directed by Crossbelt Mani. The film stars Madhu, Sheela, Kaviyoor Ponnamma and Adoor Bhasi in the lead roles. The film had musical score by V. Dakshinamoorthy.

Cast
Madhu
Sheela
Kaviyoor Ponnamma
Adoor Bhasi
Prema
Bahadoor
Meena
Rani Chandra
Vanchiyoor Radha
Veeran

Soundtrack
The music was composed by V. Dakshinamoorthy and the lyrics were written by Vayalar Ramavarma.

References

External links
 

1972 films
1970s Malayalam-language films
Films directed by Crossbelt Mani